Khassa Camara (born 22 October 1992) is a professional footballer who plays as a defensive midfielder for Greek Super League 2 club Chania and the Mauritania national team. Born in France, Camara represents Mauritania at international level.

Club career
Born in Châtenay-Malabry, France, Camara has played for Troyes and Boulogne. On 9 September 2015, he signed a two-year contract with Greek club Ergotelis. After legally filing for his contract with Ergotelis to be terminated due to unpaid wages, he signed a six-month contract with top-level club Xanthi in January 2016.

On 24 September 2020, it was confirmed that Camara has joined Indian Super League outfit NorthEast United FC on a one-year deal. In August 2021, Northeast United FC extended Camara's contract for one year, with an option to extend for another year. He scored his first goal for NorthEast on 4 December against FC Goa in their 2–1 win.

He signed for Hyderabad FC in February 2022, and was part of club's trophy winning squad in the final on 20 March.

International career
He made his international debut for Mauritania on 8 September 2013 in a 0–0 draw against Canada. He scored his first goal on 8 September 2018 against Burkina Faso in a 2–0 win.

International goals
Scores and results list Mauritania's goal tally first.

Honours
Hyderabad
Indian Super League: 2021–22

References

External links
Khassa Camara at indiansuperleague.com

1992 births
Living people
People from Châtenay-Malabry
Citizens of Mauritania through descent
Mauritanian footballers
Mauritania international footballers
French footballers
French sportspeople of Mauritanian descent
ES Troyes AC players
US Boulogne players
Ergotelis F.C. players
Xanthi F.C. players
Ligue 1 players
Ligue 2 players
Association football midfielders
Footballers from Hauts-de-Seine
2019 Africa Cup of Nations players
2021 Africa Cup of Nations players
Indian Super League players
NorthEast United FC players
Expatriate footballers in India
Mauritanian expatriate sportspeople in India
Hyderabad FC players